The Estadio Olímpico de Oaxtepec is a multi-use stadium in Oaxtepec, Morelos, Mexico.  It is currently used mostly for football matches and is the home stadium for Sporting Canamy.  The stadium has a capacity of 9,000 people.

Stadium Renovation
In late July 2017, the stadium began renovating the stadium for improvement for fans. The renovation was completed on October 9.

References

External links

Sports venues in Morelos
Estadio Olimpico de Oaxtepec
Athletics (track and field) venues in Mexico
Sports venues completed in 1979
1979 establishments in Mexico